Lucienne Schmidt-Couttet (27 November 1926 – 4 October 2022) was a French alpine skier and world champion, who competed in the 1948 Winter Olympics.

Schmidt received a gold medal at the 1954 World Championships in Åre, winning the giant slalom.

Schmidt-Couttet died on 4 October 2022, at the age of 95.

References

External links

1926 births
2022 deaths
Alpine skiers at the 1948 Winter Olympics
French female alpine skiers
Olympic alpine skiers of France